Monica Niculescu and Yanina Wickmayer were the defending champions, but Wickmayer chose not to participate this year. Niculescu played alongside Sania Mirza, but lost in the semifinals to Eugenie Bouchard and Sloane Stephens.

Shuko Aoyama and Renata Voráčová won the title, defeating Bouchard and Stephens in the final, 6–3, 6–2.

Seeds
The top seed received a bye into the quarterfinals.

Draw

References
 Main Draw

Citi Open - Women's Doubles